is a Japanese multinational corporation in the telecommunications electronics equipment market. A global pioneer for producing the world's first wireless telephone network, Anritsu's revenue numbers near US$782 million.

History

In Japan, Anritsu's first predecessor, Sekisan-sha, was founded in 1895. Annaka Electric Company followed, producing wireless transmitters and the world's first wireless telephone service and Japan's first automatic public telephone.

Anritsu Corporation was formed with the merger of two companies, the Annaka Corporation and Kyoritsu Electric in Japan in 1931. In 1990, Anritsu acquired Wiltron Company in the United States for $180 million.

Currently, the Anritsu Group is composed of Anritsu Corporation, Anritsu Engineering, Anritsu Infivis, Anritsu Devices, and Anritsu Networks. Anritsu Corporation's American subsidiary, Anritsu Company, is a supplier of the United States Department of Defense.

Performance
Net sales in FY2008 were ¥84 billion (US$782 million). It has been listed on the Tokyo Stock Exchange since 1968.

Products
Products include network call trace, service assurance, customer experience management, microwave, radio frequency (RF), and optical signal generators, spectrum analyzers, and network analyzers.

References

External links 

Anritsu Corporation Global
Anritsu Company North America

Electronics companies of Japan
Electronic test equipment manufacturers
Companies based in Kanagawa Prefecture
Companies listed on the Tokyo Stock Exchange
Electronics companies established in 1895
Japanese companies established in 1895
Japanese brands
NEC subsidiaries
Companies based in Morgan Hill, California